The Akita Northern Happinets are a Japanese professional basketball team based in Akita that competes in the Eastern Conference of the First Division of the B.League. The team was formed as an expansion team of the bj league in 2010 and found success for the first time in 2013–14, finishing their fourth season as league runners-up. They went on to finish as runners-up for the second year in a row in 2014–15 and in third place in 2015–16, the final season of the bj league.

History
Akita Prefecture's connection with basketball has historically lay with Noshiro Technical High School, which has won a total of 58 national-level championships, and the Isuzu Motors corporate team (Akita Isuzu Motors, currently the Yokohama Giga Spirits), which was based in Akita from 1955 until 1987. Following the formation of the independent bj league in 2006, a committee was formed to investigate the formation of a professional club within the prefecture in 2007 but was unsuccessful. In June 2008 another association was formed to pursue a bj league franchise licence and a pre-season match between the Sendai 89ers and Niigata Albirex BB was held a few months later. In January 2009 Akita Pro Basketball Club Co., Ltd. was established and in the following May was granted a licence to enter the 2010-11 bj league season. The team's name was announced at a pre-season match hosted in Akita between the 89ers and Hamamatsu Higashimikawa Phoenix in September 2009.

2010-11 season
The Happinets entered the Eastern Conference of the bj league in October 2010 as one of three expansion teams. The Shimane Susanoo Magic and Miyazaki Shining Suns joined the Western Conference, taking the league to a total of 16 teams. For their first season the Happinets signed Seiichi Oba as general manager and former Shiga Lakestars coach Robert Pierce as head coach. 39-year-old Akita native and Noshiro Tech alumnus Makoto Hasegawa was acquired from Niigata in exchange for a first-round draft pick and took on a player-manager role. The team drafted  and Ryosuke Mizumachi in the expansion draft,  in the second round of the rookie draft and Makoto Sawaguchi in the development draft. The team was unable to reach a deal with Nakanishi, who instead signed with Rizing Fukuoka before the start of the season.  Happinets' inaugural home game was held at the Akita Prefectural Gymnasium in October.

2011-12 season
In November 2011 the team signed Curtis Terry, brother of NBA player Jason Terry, to replace the injured Brandon Wallace. After 14 games Terry was released from the club in January due to his arrest for theft from a convenience store.

2013-15 seasons
Has emerged as a strong league power, and won a conference title two years in a row.

2016-17 season
ANH struggled throughout the season and were relegated to second division.

2017-18 season
Akita finished the regular season with a 54–6 record,  defeated Kumamoto Volters in the B2 playoffs and were promoted to B1.

2018-19 season
The team suffered its 11th consecutive defeat, However, Akita was not relegated and remained in the B1 league.

2019-20 season

Coach Pep left, and Maeda was promoted from assistant coach to bench boss. The 10th anniversary team got sponsorship deals from electronics company TDK Corporation. Tokyo Denki Kagaku sponsored Liga ACB team,  TDK Manresa  
between 1985 and 2000.New practice facilities, near the Akita Station, was completed in December. Two games were played without spectators due to the COVID-19 pandemic in March.

2021-22 season
Assistant coach Makoto Tanaka was arrested for drink-driving on July 17, 2021. The team clinched their first  B. League playoff berth on May 8, 2022.

2022-23 season
Amida Brimah was released by Happinets on August 29, 2022. He originally signed for this season on July 13.

Current roster

Management

General manager
 Seiichi Oba

Managers and trainers
  Yukio Kodaka
  Shintaro Tahara
  Itsuki Midorikawa
  Ryohei Sugano

Former managers and trainers
Shigeru Takeuchi
Kento Yamasawa

Basketball academy
 Shoya Uchimura
 Yu Yoshimoto

Bicky
 unknown

Noted employee
Yasuhiko Takahashi (Wheel gymnastics champion)

Notable former players

  Seiya Ando
  Antonio Burks
  Marshall Brown
  Alex Davis
  Jordan Glynn
  Will Graves
  Makoto Hasegawa
  Sek Henry
  Justin Keenan
 Scott Morrison
  Kevin Palmer
  Richard Roby
  Kazuhiro Shoji
  Deshawn Stephens
  Shigehiro Taguchi
  Kenichi Takahashi
  Yuki Togashi
  Brandon Wallace

Season-by-season record

Team statistics
{| class="wikitable sortable" style="font-size:95%; text-align:right;"
!Year
!Lg
!GP
!MP
!FG(%)
!3P(%)
!FT(%)
!RPG
!APG
!SPG
!BPG
!PPG
!OPPG
|-
|-
| align="left" |  2010–11
| align="left" | bj
| 50 ||   10050 || .414 || .324 || .620 || 49.3 || 15.5 || 5.8 || 2.0 ||  79.4||84.3
|-
| align="left" |  2011–12
| align="left" | bj
| 52 ||  10425 || .408 || .323 || .669 || 37.3 || 15.6 || 8.0 || 2.2 ||  73.8||80.2
|-
| align="left" |  2012–13
| align="left" | bj
| 52 ||   10475 || .415 || .334 || .620 || 33.4 || 15.8 || 6.8 || 2.5 ||  77.4||76.9
|-
| align="left" |  2013–14
| align="left" | bj
| 52 ||  10475 || .457 || .354 || .692 || 40.0 || 19.4 || 7.1 || 3.0 || 90.2 ||81.1
|-
| align="left" |  2014–15
| align="left" | bj
| 52 ||   10475 || .484 || .375 || .679 || 38.8 || 20.3 || 7.1 || 4.1 || 89.2 ||77.1
|-
| align="left" |  2015–16
| align="left" | bj
| 52 ||   10475 || .462 || .359 || .692|| 46.3 || 19.7 || 7.4 || 3.1 || 83.9 ||75.9
|-
| align="left" |  2016–17
| align="left" | B1
| 60 ||  12150 || .425 || .342 || .684 || 37.5 || 12.1 || 6.3 || 1.9 || 70.4 ||74.3
|-
| align="left" |  2017–18
| align="left" | B2
| 60 ||   12000 || .437 || .339 || .631 || 40.7 || 20.6 ||bgcolor="CFECEC"| 11.9 || bgcolor="CFECEC"|3.5 || 80.0 || bgcolor="CFECEC"|67.7 
|-
| align="left" |  2018–19
| align="left" | B1
| 60 ||  12025 || .421 || .307 || .696 || 36.8 || 18.3 || bgcolor="CFECEC"|8.2|| 2.9|| 71.3||78.2 
|-
| align="left" |  2019–20
| align="left" | B1
| 41 ||8200   || .430 || .306 || .711 || 35.8 || 19.1 || bgcolor="CFECEC"|9.7|| 3.0|| 75.5||73.9 
|-
| align="left" |  2020–21
| align="left" | B1
| 59 ||11875   || .435 || .319 || .696 || 35.5 ||  20.7  || 9.1|| bgcolor="CFECEC"|4.0|| 77.5||78.1 
|-
| align="left" |  2021–22
| align="left" | B1
| 54 ||10850   || .446 || bgcolor="CFECEC"|.378 || .751 || 36.1 ||  20.7  || 8.9|| 2.7|| 78.7||75.7 
|-

Other honors and titles
Tohoku Cup
Champions (5): 2012, 2013, 2016, 2021, 2022
Tohoku Early Cup
Champions (2): 2017, 2019

Head coaches

Assistant coaches
 Yoichi Motoyasu
 Joe Cook
 Kenjiro Maeda

Uniforms

Cheerleading squad

The Akita Northern Happinets Cheer Dance Team are the official B.League Cheerleading squad representing Happinets. The group performs at CNA Arena Akita, the home court of the Happinets. The squad also has a "Junior Cheer School Programme", for young women aged 5–12.

Director
Mineko Abe

Instructor
Aimi Sukagawa

Members
Ikumi
So
Nene
Yumi
Kanon
Nanami
Rio
Shiho
Jr-Rio
Source:

Mascot

Bicky is the official mascot of the Akita Northern Happinets. The Frog wears #82 and is able to slam-dunk. He is 182 cm tall and weighs 82 kg. Happinets introduced a new mascot Rana, Bicky's girl friend, on June 26, 2020.  University HOSP man is the unofficial mascot.

Arenas & Facilities

The Happinets play their home games at CNA Arena Akita, their home since 2016. During their time in the bj league, the Happinets played their home games at the Akita Prefectural Gymnasium. Another home, Nices Arena is an indoor sporting arena located in Yurihonjo. A new prefectural gymnasium will be built in 2026. The team has practice facilities at the Akita Northern Gate Square, Akita Bank Gymnasium, Akita Xerox Sports Square and Akita International University Suda Hall. They also build muscle at Varsity Weight Room in Yabase, Akita.　Happinets players love to take spa at Youland Hotel Yabase in Akita. (Tattooed players have special privileges to take a bath.)

"Crazy Pink" phenomenon

The Happinets fans are widely known as "Crazy Pink" and sometimes have overwhelming numbers at the visitors games. The hoop-crazed fans light up arena with "Bigabiga", pink glow sticks and sing the prefectural anthem before the game. The Happinets home court rocks with another stadium anthem "Fly Again" by Man with a Mission, and CNA Arena Akita is the one of the hottest and loudest basketball venues in Asia. The Akita Airport limousine buses have the painted images of the Happinets and Blaublitz Akita.

Kit

Manufacturer

Average regular season home game attendance

Media

Radio
The Happinets players' talk show is aired occasionally on ABS. The Happinets don't have any play-by-play radio broadcasting.

Programs
 ABS - Akita wo sakebe Northern Happinets
 ABS - Nantettatte Nichiyou ha Sports
 ABS - Kosaka Rika no Cheer Happinets
 FM Akita - Weekly Northern Happinets (Takashi Hatakeyama)
 FM Hanabi - Uchiagero Go! Go! Akita Northern Happinets!!

Television
SoftBank Group Corp. is estimated to have invested over ¥12 billion to get the broadcasting rights of B.League in 2016. The Happinets home game broadcasters are Toshifumi Takeshima (Akita Television, play-by-play announcer) and Hiroyuki Chida (JR Akita Peckers).

Programs
 AAB - Go Happinets!

References

External links 

 
Basketball teams in Japan
Sport in Akita (city)
Sports teams in Akita Prefecture
Basketball teams established in 2010
2010 establishments in Japan